Araiophos eastropas is a species of ray-finned fish in the genus Araiophos. It lives in the Western Central Pacific.

References

Sternoptychidae
Fish described in 1969